Africaine is a Luxembourgish brand of cigarettes, currently owned and manufactured by "Landewyck Tobacco". Africaine is French for African.

History
Africaine was launched in the early 1940s. During World War II, Maryland was launched because of the lack of raw tobacco that was available at the time to produce Africaine cigarettes. After the end of the war, the brand became popular within Luxembourg.

Various advertising posters were made for Africaine cigarettes.

The brand is mainly sold in Luxembourg, but it was or still is sold in some parts of Germany and Italy.

See Also

 Tobacco smoking

References

Cigarette brands